Miss Universe Great Britain 2020 was the 12th Miss Universe Great Britain pageant. It was held in London on 8 March 2021. Originally scheduled for 11 July 2020, but due to the COVID-19 pandemic, this was rescheduled to 19 December 2020 and delayed once again hours before the event was to start due to the new strain of virus detected in Southeast England, this was out from the schedule for the second time. 

Jeanette Akua was virtually crowned Miss Great Britain 2020 by Emma Jenkins of Wales and will represent Great Britain at the Miss Universe 2020.

Final results

Official Delegates

References

External links
Official Website

2020
2020 in London
2021 beauty pageants
March 2021 events in the United Kingdom
Events postponed due to the COVID-19 pandemic